USSU may refer to:

 University of Salford Students' Union
 University of Surrey Students' Union